Dooleys was the first UK album by British pop group The Dooleys. It was released on GTO Records in 1978 and featured the top 20 hits "Think I'm Gonna Fall in Love with You", "Love of My Life" and "A Rose Has to Die".

Background 

The Dooleys had been a recording act for four years by this point, but it wasn't until mid 1977 when they scored their first chart hit with "Think I'm Gonna Fall in Love With You", which reached the UK top 20. Follow-up single "Love of My Life" became a top 10 hit, while "Don't Take it Lyin' Down" was also a minor hit. The group then released this, their first studio album. (They had released an earlier album in Russia, which was a live album recorded while they toured there, and had sold well.)) Despite three hit singles, the album failed to chart. After its release, another single was taken from it; "A Rose Has to Die", which also was a top 20 success, peaking at No.11. The album was mainly produced by Ben Findon, who would go on to be songwriter and producer for the group for a few more years and would guide them through their hit-making period. The album also included "Hands Across the Sea", which had been The Dooleys first ever single back in 1974, and had also been an entry into A Song for Europe that year, performed by Olivia Newton-John.

In 1977, South African singer Dennis East's version of "Stone Walls", reached number 12 on the South African charts. "A Rose Has to Die" was also recorded by UK group The Ryders, while "What's Gonna Happen to Our Love" had been recorded by Billy Ocean.

Soon after the release of the album, the group's younger sister, Helen Dooley joined the line-up, after having contributed to the writing of one of this album's tracks.

Dooleys was released on Compact disc for the first time on 14 September 2009 in a double-pack with The Chosen Few.

Track listing 

Side one
 "Love of My Life" (Findon Myers) 3.06
 "Absolutely Wild Over You" (Findon / Myers) 2.48
 "Dont Let Me Be the Last to Know" (Findon / Myers) 3.40
 "A Rose Has to Die" (Findon) 2.43
 "Better Off Without You" (Findon / Myers) 3.38
 "Hands Across the Sea" (Findon / Wilkins) 3.23

Side two
 "Think I'm Gonna Fall in Love With You" (Findon / Myers) 3.04
 "Stone Walls" (Findon / Wilkins) 3.03
 "What's Gonna Happen to Our Love" (Findon / Wilkins) 3.02
 "You Make My Heart Beat Faster" (Findon / Wilkins) 3.02
 "Forever" (Dooleys / Myers / H. Dooley) 3.18
 "Don't Take It Lying Down" (Findon / Myers) 3.24

CD Bonus tracks
 "Goodbye Hallelujah Island" (The Dooleys) 2.48
 "Only You Can Get Me By" (J. Dooley / B. Walsh) 2.45
 "Hungry for Love" (Findon / Myers) 2.46

Personnel 
Jim Dooley - vocals
Anne Dooley - vocals
Kathy Dooley - vocals
John Dooley - Guitar and vocals
Frank Dooley - Guitar and vocals
Bob Walsh - Bass guitar
Alan Bogan - Drums
 Ben Findon - Producer
 Mike Myers - Assistant producer
 Tom Parker - Orchestration
George Nicholson - Engineer
Simon Wakefield - Engineer
 Recorded at Morgan Studios, London

References 

The Dooleys albums
1978 debut albums
GTO Records albums